Quidgest is a software engineering company headquartered in Lisbon, Munich, Maputo and Dili. It was founded in Lisbon, Portugal in 1988.

References 

Software companies of Portugal
Companies established in 1988